Delmont Edward Gullery (23 November 1905 – 13 August 1982) was a New Zealand rowing coxswain.

Gullery was born in 1905 in Picton, New Zealand. He represented New Zealand at the 1932 Summer Olympics. He is listed as New Zealand Olympian athlete number 30 by the New Zealand Olympic Committee.

Gullery died on 13 August 1982 in Wanganui, New Zealand.

References

1905 births
1982 deaths
New Zealand male rowers
Rowers at the 1932 Summer Olympics
Olympic rowers of New Zealand
Rowers from Picton, New Zealand
Coxswains (rowing)
20th-century New Zealand people